Bishop John Christopher Mahon, D.C.L, S.P.S. (1922-2004), was an Irish born priest a member of the Kiltegan Fathers. He served as Bishop of Lodwar, Turkana, Kenya from 1978 until 2000.
Mahon was born on 25 December 1922 in Killurin, Killeigh, Co. Offaly, Ireland. He was educated at Tullamore C.B.S., and Knockbeg College, Carlow.

He was ordained a priest in 1948. Mahon studied Canon Law in St. Patrick's College, Maynooth earning a doctorate in 1951.

He joined the teaching staff of the Saint Patrick's Society for the Foreign Missions, Kiltegan.

Dr Mahon left Kiltegan in 1959 when he was appointed to the Roman Catholic Diocese of Ogoja, Nigeria, where he was Head of St. Thomas’ Teacher Training College.

After nine years in Nigeria, Rev. Mahon moved to Kenya, after the outbreak of the Nigerian Civil War. 
Mahon was ordained first Bishop of Lodwar on 25 April 1978.

He died in Nairobi, Kenya suddenly on 10 November 2004, aged 82, and is buried where he served as bishop in Turkana, Kenya.

References

1922 births
2004 deaths
20th-century Irish Roman Catholic priests
Roman Catholic missionaries in Kenya
20th-century Roman Catholic bishops in Kenya
Irish expatriate Catholic bishops
Alumni of St Patrick's College, Maynooth
People from County Offaly
Roman Catholic bishops of Lodwar
Irish expatriates in Kenya